Paul Dunmall (born 6 May 1953) is a British jazz musician who plays tenor and soprano saxophone, as well as the baritone and the more exotic saxello and the Northumbrian smallpipes. He has played with Keith Tippett and Barry Guy.

In the early 1970s Dunmall joined progressive rock band "Marsupilami" for their second album, Arena. He toured with the band until it folded in September 1971 but played with the band on the Spirit of 1971 stage  in 2011 at the Glastonbury Festival. He then became a member of the Divine Light Mission and toured the U.S. His first recording as sideman was as the saxophonist on the 1976 Johnny Guitar Watson album Ain't That a Bitch.

Discography

As leader
1986 Soliloquy MATCHLESS MR 15 
1989/93 Folks Duo with Paul Rogers SLAMCD 212 
1990 The journey Mujician CUNEIFORM RUNE 42 
1991 The Bristol concert Mujician/The Georgian Ensemble WHAT DISC WHAT7CD 
1992 Live in London Paul Dunmall/Tim Wells/Dave Alexander DUNS L.E.015 
1993 Quartet, Sextet and Trio/Babu SLAMCD 207 
1993 Birmingham concert Parker/Dunmall/Guy/Levin RARE MUSIC RM026 
1993/4 Spiritual empathy Duo with Tony Levin RARE MUSIC RM024 
1994 Poem about the hero Mujician CUNEIFORM RUNE 62 
1995 Early October British Saxophone Quartet SLAMCD 216 
1995 Birdman Mujician CUNEIFORM RUNE 82  
1995 Long meadow Paul Dunmall/Andy Isham DUNS LIMITED EDITION 011 
1995 If Dubois only knew Elton Dean/Paul Dunmall BLUEPRINT BP194CD 
1996 Bladik Mujician/Roswell Rudd/Elton Dean CUNEIFORM RUNE 92 
1996 Essential expressions Duo with Tony Levin CADENCE JAZZ RECORD CJR 1079 
1996 Desire and liberation Paul Dunmall Octet SLAMCD 225 
1996 Ghostly thoughts Paul Dunmall/John Adams/Mark Sanders HATOLOGY 503 
1997 Colours fulfilled Mujician CUNEIFORM RUNE 102 
1997 Zap II Paul Dunmall/Mark Sanders/Steve Noble/Oren Marshall/John Adams DUNS L.E.004 
1997 Bebop stardust Paul Dunmall Octet CUNEIFORM RUNE 112 
1997 Cocteau's ghost Paul Dunmall/Tony Irving DUNS L.E.DLE 034 
1997 Elton Elton Dean/Paul Dunmall/Paul Rogers/Tony Levin DUNS L.E.051 
1998 Shooters Hill Paul Dunmall Sextet FMRCD141-0104 
1998 Totally fried up Paul Dunmall/John Adams/Mark Sanders SLAMCD 235 
1999 Solo bagpipes DUNS L.E.001 
1999 Utoma Trio Tony Bianco/Paul Dunmall/Simon Picard EMANEM 4040 
1999 Live at 'The Subtone' Dunmall/Adams/Sanders DUNS L.E.002 
1999 Hit and run Dunmall with Edwards with Butcher FMP CD 116 
1999 Bersudsky's machines Brian Irvine COYOTE RECORDS YOTE 004 
1999/2000 Master musicians of MU Paul Dunmall/Philip Gibbs SLAMCD 241 
2000 QED Elton Dean BLUEPRINT BP339CD 
2000 Out from the cage Dunmall/Bianco/Edwards/Adams FMR CD107-i0602 
2000 It escapes me Paul Dunmall/Tony Marsh/Philip Gibbs DUNS L.E.003 
2000 Zap III Paul Dunmall/Tony Marsh/Steve Noble/Oren Marshall/Philip Gibbs/John Adams DUNS L.E.005 
2000 Onosante Paul Dunmall/Keith Tippett/Philip Gibbs/Pete Fairclough DUNS L.E.006 
2000 EastWestNorthSouth Dunmall/Adams/Gibbs/Sanders FMR CD72-0900 
2000 The Great divide Paul Dunmall Octet CUNIEFORM RUNE 142 
2001 I You Dunmall/Bianco FMR CD87-0801 
2001 Manjah Paul Dunmall/Philip Gibbs/M. Balachandar DUNS L.E.007 
2001 Skirting the river road: songs and settings of Whitman Blake and Vaughan Robin Williamson ECM 1785 
2001 Alien art Paul Dunmall/Paul Rogers DUNS L.E.008 
2001 Something normal Paul Dunmall/Philip Gibbs/John Adams DUNS L.E.010 
2001 Gwinks Paul Dunmall/Paul Rogers/Philip Gibbs DUNS L.E.009 
2001 Solo bagpipes II DUNS L.E.012  
2001 Ja ja spoon Paul Dunmall/Paul Rogers DUNS L.E.013 
2001 Live at the Klinker 2001 Paul Dunmall/Tony MarshDUNS L.E.016 
2001 Zooplongoma Dunmall/Jeffries/Gibbs/Adams/Marsh DUNS L.E.019 
2001 Spacetime Mujician CUNEIFORM RUNE 162 
2001 Kunikazu Paul Dunmall/Keith Tippett/Philip Gibbs/Peter Fairclough/Roberto Bellatalla DUNS L.E.017 
2001 Simple skeletons Paul Dunmall/Philip Gibbs/Paul Rogers/Tony Levin DUNS L.E.014 
2001 Dark clouds gathering Paul Dunmall/Philip Gibbs/Tony Bianco/Chris Dodds DUNS L.E.018 
2001 All sorts of rituals Paul Dunmall/Philip Gibbs DUNS L.E.020 
2002 The vision Paul Dunmall/Philip Gibbs DUNS L.E.021 
2002 The State of Moksha Paul Dunmall/Paul Rogers/Philip Gibbs DUNS L.E.022 
2002 The State of Moksha live Paul Dunmall/Paul Rogers/Philip Gibbs DUNS L.E.024 
2002 Hour glass Two trios of Tony Bianco and Paul Dunmall with Marcio Mattos/Paul Rogers EMANEM 4208 
2002 Bridging: The Great divide live Paul Dunmall Octet CLEAN FEED CF017CD 
2002 Bread & wine Paul Dunmall/Tony Bianco DUNS L.E.025 
2002 Live at the Quaker Centre Paul Dunmall/Paul Rogers/Philip Gibbs DUNS L.E.023 
2002 No agents of evil Paul Dunmall/Philip Gibbs/Andrew Ball/Neil Metcalfe/Hilary Jeffreys DUNS L.E.026 
2002 High bird, low bird Paul Dunmall/Hilary Jeffreys/Tony Marsh DUNS L.E.027 
2002 Garganchelopes Paul Dunmall/Philip Gibbs/Hilary Jeffreys/Tony Bianco DUNS L.E.028 
2003 In your shell like Paul Dunmall/Paul Lytton/Stevie Wishart EMANEM 4111 
2003 It's abit nocturnal Paul Dunmall/Paul Rogers/Philip Gibbs/Neil Metcalfe DUNS L.E.029 
2003 Can't just be a body Paul Dunmall/Philip Gibbs/John Adams DUNS L.E.031 
2003 Newsagents Paul Dunmall/Philip Gibbs/Andrew Ball/Neil Metcalfe/Hilary Jeffreys DUNS L.E.032 
2003 Rylickolum: for your pleasure Paul Dunmall/Paul Rogers/Kevin Norton CIMP #289 
2003 Go forth Duck Paul Dunmall/Paul Rogers/Kevin Norton CIMP #296 
2003 Solo bagpipes FMRCD118-0603 
2003 Log cabins Paul Dunmall/Paul Rogers DUNS L.E.033 
2003 I wish you peace Paul Dunmall Moksha Big Band CUNEIFORM RUNE 203 
2003 Awareness response Paul Dunmall/Paul Rogers EMANEM 4101 
2003 19 years later Paul Dunmall/Bruce Coates DUNS L.E.035 
2004 Nimes Paul Dunmall/Paul Rogers/Philip Gibbs (4-CD set limited to 85 copies) DUNS L.E.036 
2004 Love, warmth and compassion Paul Dunmall Quartet FMRCD155-i0804 
2004 Moksha or mocca Paul Dunmall/Paul Rogers/Philip Gibbs/Rhodri Davies DUNS L.E.038 
2004 Not a bit like coco Paul Dunmall/Paul Rogers/Philip Gibbs/Neil Metcalfe DUNS L.E.037 
2004 Brothers in music Paul Dunmall/Simon Thoumire/John Edwards/Philip Gibbs DUNS L.E.039 
2004 Undistracted Paul Rogers/Andrew Ball/Philip Gibbs/Jonathan Impett/Paul Dunmall DUNS L.E.040 
2004 Live at the Old Library Paul Dunmall/Bruce Coates/Philip Gibbs/Hilary Jeffrey DUNS L.E.043 
2004 Live at the Priory Dartington Improvising Trio FMRCD161-i0205 
2004 Vesuvius Schlippenbach/Dunmall/Rogers/Bianco SLAMCD 262 
2004 Deep joy Tony Levin/Paul Dunmall/Paul Rogers (4-CD set) DUNS L.E.041 
2005 Bernd Wimmer on the burnt zimmer Paul Dunmall/Philip Gibbs/Steve Davis/Dave Kane DUNS L.E.042 
2005 Mahogany rain Keith Tippett/Julie Tippetts/Philip Gibbs/Paul Dunmall DUNS L.E.044 
2005 The big return Philip Gibbs/Paul Rogers/Paul Dunmall DUNS L.E.045 
2005 Thank you Dorothy Paul Dunmall/Paul Rogers/Philip Gibbs/Tony Levin DUNS L.E.046 
2005 Tapaleit Paul Dunmall/Marcus Stockhausen/Philip Gibbs DUNS L.E.047 
2005 Neen Philip Gibbs/Tony Hymas/Paul Dunmall DUNS L.E.048 
2005 Unnaturals, sharps & flats Solo FMRCD167-i0805 
2005 Illuminations Duo with Trevor Taylor FMRCD171-i0805 
2005 Don't take the magic out of life Paul Dunmall/Paul Rogers/Philip Gibbs DUNS L.E.049 
2005 Cosmic craftsmen Paul Rogers/Tony Bianco/Paul Dunmall FMRCD185-i1105 
2005 Zooghosis Paul Dunmall/Trevor Taylor/Paul Rogers FMRCD189-i0106 
2005 Peace and joy Paul Dunmall/Paul Rogers/Philip Gibbs/Hamid Drake SLAMCD267 
2005 There's no going back now Mujician CUNEIFORM RUNE 232 
2006 Solo tenor DUNS L.E. 050 
2006 Music on two pianos Paul Dunmall/Philip Gibbs DUNS L.E.052  
2006 Occasional rain Paul Dunmall/Peter Brandt FMRCD211-1106 
2006 Deep well Paul Dunmall/Peter Brandt/Tony Marsh FMRCD207-0606 
2006 Blown away Paul Dunmall/Philip Gibbs/Roy Campbell/Daniel Carter/Paul Rogers/William Parker/Hamid Drake DUNS L.E.053
2009 Opus de Life with Henry Grimes and Andrew Cyrille as the Profound Sound Trio, Porter PRCD - 4032
2012 Intervention Paul Dunmall/Neil McGovern (Ft. Matt London) FMRCD334-0412

As sideman
1976 Ain't That a Bitch, Johnny "Guitar" Watson, DJM Records: DJLPA-3
1982 Mice in the wallet Spirit Level SPOTLITE 
1984 Proud owners Spirit Level SPOTLITE  
1986 Killer Bunnies Jack Walrath + Spirit Level (Spotlite) 
1986 Soliloquy MATCHLESS MR 15 
1989 Swiss Radio tapes Spirit Level RISR 
1979-1999 Great spirit: best of Spirit Level Spirit Level 33JAZZ051 
1987 A Andy Shepherd ANTILLES 
1989 Whatever next Danny Thompson ANTILLES 
1987/88 Two's and three's Elton Dean VOICEPRINT VP167CD 
1987/1988 Zurich Concerts London Jazz Composers Orchestra INTAKT 005 
1989 Harmos London Jazz Composers Orchestra INTAKT CD013 
1989 Double Trouble London Jazz Composers Orchestra INTAKT CD019 
1989 Elton Dean's Unlimited Saxophone Company Elton Dean OGUN OGCD 002. 
1990 Elemental Danny Thompson ANTILLES 
1990 The saxophone phenomenon Various Artists SLAMCD 401 
1991 Theoria London Jazz Composers Orchestra INTAKT CD 024 
1991 Study II/Stringer London Jazz Composers Orchestra INTAKT CD095  
1991 Passed Normal volume 5 Elton Dean ensemble FOT PN5 
1993 View across the bay Polly Bolton PBB  
1993 Portraits London Jazz Composers Orchestra INTAKT CD 035 
1995 Shepherd wheel The Fairclough Group ASC CD 1 
1995 Early October British Saxophone Quartet SLAMCD 216 
1995 Three pieces for orchestra London Jazz Composers Orchestra INTAKT CD 045 
1995 Double Trouble Two London Jazz Composers Orchestra INTAKT CD 053 
1995 Silent knowledge Elton Dean Quintet CUNEIFORM RUNE 83 
1996 Bladik Elton Dean with Mujician/Roswell Rudd CUNEIFORM RUNE 92 
1996 Extremely Quartet John Law HAT ART CD 6199 
1997 Industry Richard Thompson EMI 
1999 Bersudsky's machines Brian Irvine COYOTE RECORDS YOTE 004 
2000 QED Elton Dean BLUEPRINT BP339CD 
2001 Skirting the river road: songs and settings of Whitman Blake and Vaughan Robin Williamson ECM 1785 
2003 Solo bagpipes FMRCD118-0603 
2003 Now Intuitive Art Ensemble FMRCD121-0703 
2011 Montana Strange Brian Irvine Ensemble FMRCD315

References

English jazz saxophonists
British male saxophonists
Avant-garde jazz musicians
Jazz tenor saxophonists
Free improvisation
CIMP artists
Living people
1953 births
21st-century saxophonists
21st-century British male musicians
British male jazz musicians
Mujician members
Clean Feed Records artists
FMR Records artists
NoBusiness Records artists
Emanem Records artists
ECM Records artists